Fiona Smith (born Fiona Elliott, 13 November 1963) is a former English female badminton player.

Badminton career
Smith is six times English National singles champion and a mixed doubles champion.

She represented England and won four medals. A gold medal in the team event, a silver medal singles and mixed doubles and a bronze medal in the women's doubles, at the 1986 Commonwealth Games in Edinburgh, Scotland.

Four years later she won three further medals (all gold) playing under her married name of Fiona Smith. The gold medals came in the singles, doubles and team event.

In addition to her National and Commonwealth Games successes she was a silver medalist at the 1990 European Championships in Moscow and has over 75 caps for England.

Personal life
She gave birth to her son Oli on 4 March 1991. She was coached and trained by her brother Mark Elliott (England Junior International and Surrey County stalwart).

References

External links
 
 

1963 births
Living people
English female badminton players
Commonwealth Games medallists in badminton
Commonwealth Games gold medallists for England
Commonwealth Games silver medallists for England
Commonwealth Games bronze medallists for England
Badminton players at the 1990 Commonwealth Games
Badminton players at the 1986 Commonwealth Games
Medallists at the 1986 Commonwealth Games
Medallists at the 1990 Commonwealth Games